= Erin Ralph =

American entrepreneur, writer and producer

Erin Ralph is an American entrepreneur, writer and producer of Irish and English descent. She is founder of CoCre.org, a platform that crowdsources resources for nonprofits and for-good missions. She is a founding partner of SERENE, a community for women built around consciousness and well-being.

Erin began freelance writing for lifestyle, travel and fashion media outlets when she was 11 years old. When she was 13 she created and ran LuxuryFashion.com, one of the first online fashion magazines and interactive communities, for over a decade. At 24 she became executive director of ZINK Magazine, which she helped relaunch and establish its digital content. In March 2010 she launched and became director/Editor-in-Chief of Bullett Magazine, along with her brother Nick Ralph, creative director Sah D'Simone, art director James Orlando, stylist Jonathan Rackleff and current director Idil Tabanca. Bullett Magazine was a quarterly fashion, arts and culture magazine that featured a flip-cover for a unisex audience. The Bullett Media Company also featured a creative agency and digital content. Within nine months Bullett went from concept to the shelves of hundreds of newsstands and Barnes & Noble stores across the United States. Its second issue sold international. The launch issue featured Cindy Crawford and Mark Ruffalo on its cover. In March 2011, Erin sold her shares of Bullett to Tabanca, where it now exists as an online magazine and creative agency.

Erin has since shared her story about turning her attention to social action for the betterment of the world.
